Turunmaa may refer to:
 Åboland or Turunmaa, a current region of Finland
 Finnish gunboat Turunmaa
 Turunmaa class gunboat

See also 
 Turuma, a type of frigate used by the Swedes in the late 18th and early 19th century